Federation CJA is a Canadian Jewish organization that raises and distributes funds by facilitating and overseeing the delivery of services and programs.

History
Federation CJA is one of the oldest Canadian Jewish organization. CJA was founded in 1916 with the hope of uniting Montreal's Jewish community and providing a central fundraising organization to serve the 14 founding organizations. It has been involved in major issues facing the community, such as government restrictions on immigration beginning in the 1920s, extreme poverty during the depression, the rise of fascism in Europe and Quebec during the thirties, the Second World War and assisting the remnants of European Jewry, the birth of the State of Israel, waves of immigration including especially Holocaust survivors, Sephardic Jews  and Hungarians after the 1956 uprising, the rise of the separatist movements and outward immigration, particularly of young Jews that followed in the late 70's and 80's, as well as fighting antisemitism and assisting in meeting the needs of the most vulnerable in Montreal, Israel, and in other communities under threat around the world.

Fundraising
Combined Jewish Appeal (CJA) is the fundraising arm of Federation CJA, with over 18,000 generous donors to the annual campaign supporting various local, national, and overseas programs and activities.

Community
As a community organization, it mobilizes thousands of volunteers who devote their time and energy to raising funds, allocating the proceeds, and assisting in the delivery of services. It is one of 156 North American Jewish federations, a member of the United Israel Appeal Federations Canada, the Jewish Federations of North America, and a contributor to the Jewish Agency for Israel. Federation CJA is also affiliated with the Canadian Council for Israel and Jewish Advocacy.

Agencies
Constituent Agencies of Federation CJA include Agence Ometz, Bronfman Jewish Education Centre, Camp B'nai B'rith, Communauté sépharade unifiée du Québec (United Sefardic Community of Quebec), Cummings Jewish Centre for Seniors, Hillel Montreal, JEM Workshop Inc., Jewish Public Library, Montreal Holocaust Museum, the Segal Centre for Performing Arts, as well as the YM-YWHA Montreal Jewish Community Centres.

New leadership
In its vision of the future, the director of CJA believes that the Federation CJA must be more inclusive and recognize all Jews in a diverse Jewish population of Montreal. Past-President of Federation CJA, Marc Gold, said "the federation recognizes that it must be open to change to be relevant to Montreal Jews, especially the younger generation and those not involved with the organized community, and recognize that all Jews in a diverse Jewish population of Montreal."

References

External links
 Website of Federation CJA
 Web Magazine Tikum Olam 

Jewish community organizations
Non-profit organizations based in Montreal
Organizations established in 1917
Jewish organizations based in Canada
Jews and Judaism in Montreal
1917 establishments in Quebec